K45 may refer to:

 K-45 (Kansas highway), now part of U.S. Route 56
 Dialog K45, a Sri Lankan smartphone
 , a corvette of the Royal Navy
 , a corvette of the Indian Navy
 Junkers K 45, a German transport aircraft
 Potassium-45, an isotope of potassium
 Symphony No. 7 (Mozart), by Wolfgang Amadeus Mozart